Torres High School can refer to:
Esteban Torres High School (Los Angeles County, California, United States)
Florentino Torres High School (Manila, Philippines)